The 1923 Newcastle-upon-Tyne East by-election was held on 17 January 1923.  The by-election was held due to the death of the incumbent Labour MP, Joseph Nicholas Bell.

Electoral history

Result

Aftermath

References

Newcastle-upon-Tyne East by-election
Newcastle-upon-Tyne East by-election
Newcastle-upon-Tyne East by-election
20th century in Newcastle upon Tyne
Elections in Newcastle upon Tyne
By-elections to the Parliament of the United Kingdom in Northumberland constituencies